Joseph Haynsworth Earle (April 30, 1847May 20, 1897) was a United States Senator from South Carolina.

Biography
Born in Greenville, he attended private schools in Sumter.  He was a first year cadet at the South Carolina Military Academy (now The Citadel) at the outbreak of the Civil War enlisted in the Confederate Army. Joseph enlisted with the Charles Battery, which at the close of the war was part of Kemper's Artillery, having attained the rank of Sergeant. He graduated from Furman University (Greenville) in 1867, taught school for two years, studied law, was admitted to the bar in 1870 and commenced practice in Anderson. He returned to Sumter in 1875 and continued the practice of law; he was also interested in the logging business and in agricultural pursuits.

Earle was a member of the South Carolina House of Representatives from 1878 to 1882, and was a member of the South Carolina Senate from 1882 to 1886. He was South Carolina Attorney General from 1886 to 1890, declined the nomination for governor, and ran unsuccessfully for that office in 1890. He returned to Greenville in 1892, was elected a circuit judge in 1894, and was elected as a Democrat to the U.S. Senate, serving from March 4, 1897 until his death in Greenville on May 20, 1897. Interment was in Christ Churchyard in Greenville.

Legacy
Joseph Earle was a great-grandson of Elias Earle, a cousin of John Laurens Manning Irby, and a nephew of William Lowndes Yancey, all of whom were members of the U.S. Congress (Yancey also the C.S. Congress).

His birthplace, the Earle Town House, was added to the National Register of Historic Places in 1969.

See also
List of United States Congress members who died in office (1790–1899)

References

 Retrieved on 2008-10-18

1847 births
1897 deaths
Confederate States Army soldiers
Democratic Party members of the South Carolina House of Representatives
Democratic Party South Carolina state senators
South Carolina state court judges
South Carolina Attorneys General
Furman University alumni
Politicians from Greenville, South Carolina
Democratic Party United States senators from South Carolina
19th-century American politicians
19th-century American judges